The Riddle Rider is a 1924 American silent Western film serial directed by William James Craft starring William Desmond and Eileen Sedgwick. The film is considered to be lost. The 1927 serial The Return of the Riddle Rider is a sequel.

Cast
 William Desmond as Randolph Parker / The Riddle Rider
 Eileen Sedgwick as Nan Madden
 Helen Holmes as Julie Dean
 Claude Payton as Victor Raymond
 William Gould as Jack Archer (credited as Wililam H. Gould)
 Ben Corbett as Monte Blade
 Hughie Mack as Willie
 Albert J. Smith
 Margaret Royce
 Artie Ortego
 Yakima Canutt

Chapters

 The Canyon Torrent
 Crashing Doom
 In the Path of Death
 Plunged Into the Depths
 Race for a Fortune
 Sinister Shadows
 The Swindle
 The Frame-Up
 False Faces
 At the Brink of Death
 Thundering Steeds
 Trapped
 The Valley of Fate
 The Deadline
 The Final Reckoning

See also
 List of film serials
 List of film serials by studio

References

External links

 

1924 films
1924 lost films
1924 Western (genre) films
American silent serial films
American black-and-white films
Films directed by William James Craft
Lost Western (genre) films
Lost American films
Silent American Western (genre) films
Universal Pictures film serials
1920s American films